Gaston Louis Van Volxem (born 30 November 1892) was a Belgian ice hockey player. As part of the national ice hockey team, he won a bronze medal at the 1914 European Championships, and finished fifth and seventh at the 1920 and 1924 Olympics, respectively.

References

External links
 

1892 births
Date of death unknown
Ice hockey players at the 1920 Summer Olympics
Ice hockey players at the 1924 Winter Olympics
Olympic ice hockey players of Belgium
Belgian ice hockey defencemen
Sportspeople from Brussels